Trupti Prakash Sawant is a Bharatiya Janata Party politician from Mumbai, Maharashtra. She was a Member of Legislative Assembly from Vandre East Vidhan Sabha constituency of Mumbai, Maharashtra, India till a member of Shiv Sena. She defeated Ex Chief Minister, Narayan Rane in 2015 Bandra East By-election by margin of 19,008 votes.

Positions held
 2015: Elected to Maharashtra Legislative Assembly

See also
 Mumbai North Central Lok Sabha constituency

References

External links
 Shivsena Home Page

Living people
Politicians from Mumbai
Shiv Sena politicians
Maharashtra MLAs 2014–2019
People from Mumbai Suburban district
Marathi politicians
21st-century Indian women politicians
21st-century Indian politicians
Year of birth missing (living people)
Bharatiya Janata Party politicians from Maharashtra
Women members of the Maharashtra Legislative Assembly